Acrometopia wahlbergi is a species of fly belonging to the family Chamaemyiidae. It is native to Northern and Central Europe.

References

Chamaemyiidae
Muscomorph flies of Europe
Insects described in 1846
Taxa named by Johan Wilhelm Zetterstedt